KSTH (92.3 FM) is a radio station licensed to Holyoke, Colorado, United States.  The station is owned by Armada Media - Mccook. The station has a construction permit from the U.S. Federal Communications Commission (FCC) to increase of effective radiated power to 35,000 watts.

History
The station was assigned the call letters KKYT on August 1, 1999. On July 7, 2004, the station changed its call sign to KSTH.

References

External links

Mainstream adult contemporary radio stations in the United States
STH